The Swans of Nepryádva is a Soviet animated film about the medieval Battle of Kulikovo, released at its 600th anniversary. The film was directed by Roman Davydov at Soyuzmultfilm studio in 1980.

Plot
The cartoon starts with a back story of the 13th century – showing Mongol invasion and the Battle of the Kalka River. A century and a half passes; in Moscow prince Dmitry Ivanovich explains to his son, why he rides to The Horde. And meanwhile Tatar general Mamai hears the report of his servant about the defeat of Mongol and Tatar forces in the Battle of the Vozha River and decides to make a new campaign against Rus’.

Prince Dmitry prepares for the battle too and takes a ride to Sergius of Radonezh for a blessing. After that his army rides to Kulikovo field. Together with an old commander Bobrok he thinks over the strategy of the upcoming battle. By dawn Rus’ and the united Mongol and Tatar armies took places for battle. It starts with the duel of Peresvet and Chelubey. The former is a monk, one of two brothers, that Sergius sent with Dmitry, and Chelubey is a Mongol warrior. In the duel warriors pierce each other with spears and die the same moment. Rus’ army holds the pressure of the Mongols, until Mamai sends reinforcements. Knights of the ambush regiment, which head is Bobrok, urge to assist, but the commander waits for a signal.

Cast
Prince Dmitry Ivanovich — Konstantin Zakharov
Sergius of Radonezh — Nikolai Sergeyev
Voivoda Bobrok-Volinets — Stepan Bubnov
Prince Vladimir — Lev Shabarin
Peresvet — M. Kislyarov
Blacksmith — Vladimir Burlakov
Mamai — Vladimir Kenigson
Text by historian — Felix Yavorsky

Creators
Director: Roman Davydov
Script: Arkady Snessarev
Art directors: Alexander Vinokurov, Nikolai Yerykalov
Cameraman: Boris Kotov
Music: Vladimir Krivtsov
Sound: Vladimir Kutuzov
Animators: Oleg Safronov, Viktor Shevkov, V. Komarov, Vladimir Zarubin, Fedor Yeldinov, Vladimir Shevchenko, Alexander Mazaev, Alexander Davydov, Vitaliy Bobrov, Alexei Bukin, Vladimir Vyshegorodtsev
Historic consultant - professor dr. V. Buganov
Editor: Elena Nikitkina
Director of the picture: Nikolay Yevlukhin

External links
 
 «Лебеди Непрядвы» at Animator.ru
 , (var2)

Soviet animated films
1980 animated films
1980 films